The Karnataka Legislature is the bicameral legislature of the Indian state of Karnataka. The Legislature is composed of:

the Karnataka Legislative Council, the upper house,
the Karnataka Legislative Assembly, the lower house, and
the Governor of Karnataka

References 

 
Bicameral legislatures
Legislature
State legislatures of India